Thoại Sơn is a rural district (huyện) of An Giang province in the Mekong Delta region of Vietnam.

In 2003 the district had a population of 187,620. The district covers an area of 456 km². The district capital lies at Núi Sập.  

The "Óc Eo" ruins of Cattara in the Kingdom of Funan is located here and they are believed to be from a trading port dating to between the 1st and 7th centuries CE. Thoại Sơn borders Châu Thành to the north, Tri Tôn to the west, Long Xuyên to the east and Kiên Giang province to the south. 

The district is the location of Sap mountain, Ba mountain and the Hồ Ông Thoại tourist region.

References

Districts of An Giang province
An Giang province